Alejandro "Álex" Grimaldo García (born 20 September 1995) is a Spanish professional footballer who plays as a left-back for Primeira Liga club Benfica.

Club career

Barcelona

Born in Valencia, Valencian Community, Grimaldo joined Barcelona's youth system in 2008. He made his official debut for the B-team on 4 September 2011, starting in a 4–0 away win against Cartagena at the age of 15 years and 349 days and becoming the youngest player ever to appear in a Segunda División game.

On 23 February 2013, Grimaldo suffered a serious knee injury, being ruled out for the remainder of the season. He returned to action in January of the following year, appearing in 14 matches to help his team finish in third position.

On 13 September 2014, Grimaldo scored his first professional goal, netting his side's last in a 3–2 success at Alavés. In a campaign which saw the team relegated, he netted four times in 36 matches; he and Sergi Palencia were sent off on 25 April 2015, in a 2–1 win over Ponferradina at the Mini Estadi.

Benfica
On 29 December 2015, as his contract was about to expire, Grimaldo signed with Portuguese champions Benfica until 2021, for €1.5 million. Barcelona has the right to a percentage of a future sale.

Grimaldo played his first game with his new team on 26 January 2016, coming in as a 62nd-minute substitute for Sílvio in a 6–1 away routing of Moreirense for the Taça da Liga. He debuted in the Primeira Liga on 29 February, featuring the full 90 minutes in a 2–0 home win against União da Madeira; he only appeared once more in the latter competition until the end of the season, filling in for suspended Eliseu in a 4–1 success over Nacional also at the Estádio da Luz that sealed the club's third consecutive national championship. He remained in the team for the league cup final on 20 May, the 6–2 defeat of Marítimo at the Estádio Cidade de Coimbra.

Grimaldo's first full season began on 7 August 2016, as he started in a 3–0 win against Braga for the Supertaça Cândido de Oliveira in Aveiro, assisting Franco Cervi for the opening goal. On 2 October he scored his first goal for the club, a free kick to conclude a 4–0 home triumph over Feirense; on 28 May 2017, he played the full 90 minutes in the final of the Taça de Portugal, won after defeating Vitória de Guimarães 2–1.

Grimaldo's maiden appearance in the UEFA Champions League took place on 13 September 2016, when he played the entire 1–1 group stage home draw to Beşiktaş. His first goal in the competition came during the same stage but on 2 October 2018, in a 3–2 away win over AEK Athens; he repeated the feat against the latter opponent on 12 December in the return fixture, his 30-meter free kick in the 88th minute helping to a 1–0 victory.

International career
Grimaldo won his first cap for the Spain under-21 team on 5 February 2013 – before he had turned 18 – playing the second half of a 1–1 friendly draw in Belgium.

Career statistics

Club

Honours

Benfica
 Primeira Liga: 2015–16, 2016–17, 2018–19
 Taça de Portugal: 2016–17
 Taça da Liga: 2015–16
 Supertaça Cândido de Oliveira: 2016, 2017, 2019

Spain
 UEFA European Under-19 Championship: 2012

Individual
 UEFA European Under-19 Championship Team of the Tournament: 2012
 UEFA Europa League Squad of the Season: 2018–19
Primeira Liga Team of the Year: 2018–19
Primeira Liga Defender of the Month: December/January 2023, February 2023

References

External links

 Profile at the S.L. Benfica website
 
 
 

1995 births
Living people
Spanish footballers
Footballers from Valencia (city)
Association football defenders
Segunda División players
Segunda División B players
FC Barcelona Atlètic players
Primeira Liga players
S.L. Benfica footballers
Spain youth international footballers
Spain under-21 international footballers
Spanish expatriate footballers
Expatriate footballers in Portugal
Spanish expatriate sportspeople in Portugal